General elections are held in the Autonomous Region in Muslim Mindanao for the posts of Regional Governor and Vice-Governor on March 25, 1993. The Lakas-NUCD-UMDP party won a majority of the positions during the election.

Electoral system

Regional governor and vice governor 
The election is regionwide, under the first-past-the-post system. The candidate with the highest number of votes is elected.

Regional assembly 
Each province is divided into two districts, each electing three members via multiple non-transferable vote.

Results

Regional Governor

Regional Vice-Governor

Regional Legislative Assembly

References

See also
Commission on Elections
Politics of the Philippines
Philippine elections

1993
1993 elections in the Philippines